Jean-Marie Pontaut (born 26 February 1947 in Neuilly-sur-Seine) is a French investigative journalist, working for the daily L'Express, after a start and a return trip to Le Point.

Biography 
Pontaut often worked in collaboration with Jacques Derogy.

The former Prime Minister Dominique de Villepin lodged a complaint against him for defamation. The trial set for 21 and 22 June 2007, was postponed, Jean-Marie Pontaut having called as witnesses Jean-Louis Gergorin,  and Denis Robert, charged in the criminal part of the Clearstream affair, as well as General Philippe Rondot. It is now time for the criminal investigation to be completed and the case finally decided, which can take years.

Career 
From 1970 to 1972, he was a reporter for the weekly Paris Match. From 1972 to July 1984, he was a reporter and head of inquiry at the weekly newspaper Le Point, in charge of judicial and police files. In September 1981, he became a member of the study commission of the Ministry of the Interior on the police. From July 1984 to November 1984, he was head of the society department of the weekly Le Point. From November 1984 to September 1986, he became a senior reporter for the weekly L'Express, and from September 1986 to August 1987, became head of the newspaper company's service department, where he became deputy editor-in-chief and head of the investigations section, from August 1987 to December 1988. From December 1988 to July 1995, he remained deputy editor-in-charge of the weekly newspaper Le Point, in charge of investigations at the service "Nation" and editor in chief of investigations. From September 1995 to February 1996, he was Deputy Editor-in-Chief of Europe 1, where he also presented the weekly investigations magazine Témoin n°1. Since April 1996, he has been editor (investigations) of the weekly L'Express.

Prizes and distinctions 
 1987: Prix de la foundation Mumm. 
 1993: Prix Radio-France Nancy-Lorraine de la communication  pour Investigation, passion.
 1993: Feuille d'or de la ville de Nancy.

Publications 
1981: Enquête sur les affaires d'un septennat, in collaboration with Jacques Derogy, éditions Robert Laffont, 
1984: Enquête sur les mystères de Marseille, in collaboration with Jacques Derogy, Robert Laffont, 
1986: Enquête sur trois secrets d¹État, in collaboration with Jacques Derogy, Robert Laffont
1987:  Enquête sur un Carrefour dangereux, in collaboration with Jacques Derogy, Fayard, 
1989: L'État hors la loi, in collaboration with Francis Szpiner, Fayard,   
1992; L'Attentat - Le juge Bruguière accuse Khadafi, Fayard 
1993: Investigation, Passion - Enquête sur 30 ans d'affaires, in collaboration with Jacques Derogy, Fayard,  
1994: Enquête sur les ripoux de la Côte - De l'affaire Médecin au meurtre de Yann Piat, in collaboration with Jacques Derogy, Fayard, 
1995: Agent secrète, in collaboration with Dominique Prieur, Fayard
1997: Enquête sur l'agent Hernu, cowritten with Jérôme Dupuis, Fayard
2000: L'Homme qui en sait trop - Alfred Sirven et les milliards d', in collaboration with Gilles Gaetner, Éditions Grasset
2001: Enquête sur la mort de Diana, in collaboration with Jérôme Dupuis, Stock,  
2002: Ils ont assassiné Massoud, in collaboration with Marc Epstein, Robert Laffont
2005: Demi-lune, (novel), Fayard, 
2006: Règlement de comptes pour l'Élysée - La manipulation Clearstream, in collaboration with Gilles Gaetner, OH ! Éditions, 
2006: Seul face à la justice américaine - Jean Peyrelevade accuse, in collaboration with Jean Peyrelevade, Plon, 
2008: Chronique d'une France occupée - Les rapports confidentiels de la gendarmerie, 
2014: Qui a tué le Juge Michel ?, in collaboration with Éric Pelletier, Michel Lafon, 
2015: Les grandes affaires de la Ve république, in collaboration with Philippe Broussard, Presses de la Cité,

References

External links 
 Jean-Marie Pontaut on Fayard
 Les souvenirs d'enquête de Jean-Marie Pontaut on L'Express 
 Jean-Marie Pontaut on L'Express 
 Jean-Marie Pontaut on France Inter
 Jean-Marie Pontaut on Babelio
 Jean-Marie Pontaut on France Culture
 Jean-Marie Pontaut on Atlantico
 L'invité de Ruth Elkrief: Jean-Marie Pontaut on YouTube

20th-century French journalists
21st-century French journalists
French investigative journalists
People from Neuilly-sur-Seine
1947 births
Living people